Kung Fu Panda: Legends of Awesomenesss first season airing between September 19, 2011 and 2012. The first episode "Scorpion's Sting" aired on September 19, 2011 as a sneak preview followed by another episode "The Princess and the Po" aired on October 21, 2011 also as a sneak preview. The official premiere of the first season was on November 7, 2011. Animated by Nickelodeon Animation all episodes aired on Nickelodeon, like related show The Penguins of Madagascar but unlike other related show Dragons: Riders of Berk which airs on Cartoon Network. The season's first official episode averaged 3.1 million in its premiere, slightly behind SpongeBob SquarePants, one of the network's highest rating television series.

Since almost every episode in this season introduces a brand new character, many guest stars including Ava Acres, Pamela Adlon, Diedrich Bader, Maria Bamford, Danny Cooksey, Peter Hastings, Simon Helberg, Amy Hill, April Hong, Toby Huss, John Kassir, Randall Duk Kim, Wayne Knight, David Koechner, Wendie Malick, Malcolm McDowell, Lynn Milgrim, Stephen Root, Paul Rugg, Wallace Shawn, Lauren Tom and Gary Anthony Williams, have appeared in this season.

Episodes

DVD releases

References

2011 American television seasons
2012 American television seasons